Otto V, called the Victorious or the Magnanimous (1439 – 9 January 1471), was Duke of Brunswick-Lüneburg and Prince of Lüneburg from 1457 to his death. He shared the principality with his brother, Bernard, until Bernard's death in 1464.

Otto and Bernard were the sons of Frederick II, Duke of Brunswick-Lüneburg, and succeeded him as ruling princes when Frederick retired. After Otto's death, his father returned to rule.

Life 
Otto was the son of Frederick II of Brunswick-Lüneburg and Magdalena of Brandenburg. After his brother died without issue, Otto took over the Principality of Lüneburg in 1464. Otto's reign was marked by the monastic reform movements of his time which he tried to implement in the Lüneburg monasteries. He entered Wienhausen Abbey, removed a number of art treasures which, in Otto's opinion were contrary to the ideal of monastic simplicity, and sent the abbess to be "re-educated in a monastery that was already reformed." According to a legend, Otto was killed at a tournament on the Celle jousting field. Today, a horseshoe in plaster marks the spot where Duke Otto the Magnanimous is supposed to have had the accident in 1471.

Family
Otto married Anne of Nassau-Siegen in 1467. They had the following children:
 William (died 1470)
 Henry (c. 1467–1532)

Ancestors

References

Sources 
 Geckler, Christa (1986). Die Celler Herzöge: Leben und Wirken 1371–1705. Celle: Georg Ströher. . .

External links 
 Die Welfen

1439 births
1471 deaths
Princes of Lüneburg
Middle House of Lüneburg